A referendum on convening a Constituent Assembly was held in Venezuela on 25 April 1999. Voters were asked two questions;
Should a Constituent Assembly be convened?
Do you agree with the President's suggestion of how the Assembly should be elected (each voter having ten votes)?
Both measures were approved, with 92.4% in favour of the first question and 86.5% in favour of the second. Voter turnout was 37.8%.

Results

Question I

Question II

References

1999 in Venezuela
Venezuela
Referendums in Venezuela
Constitutions of Venezuela
Constitutional referendums